Orthonama obstipata, the gem, is a moth of the family Geometridae. The species was first described by Johan Christian Fabricius in 1794. It is a cosmopolitan species. In continental Europe though in the northeast, its range does not significantly extend beyond the Baltic region and it is absent from northern Russia. This well-flying species is prone to vagrancy and able to cross considerable distances of open sea; it can thus be regularly found on the British Isles (though mainly in the south) and even on Iceland.

Under its junior synonyms Nycterosea brunneipennis and Geometra fluviata, the gem is the type species of genera Nycterosea and Percnoptilota, respectively. The latter is treated as junior synonym of the former, but Nycterosea, though usually included in Orthonama these days, may warrant recognition as an independent genus after all.

Description and ecology

Belgium and the Netherlands) they can be seen between April and November, but in outlying regions they may only be regularly encountered in late summer and early autumn, when vagrant individuals abound. This species is strongly sexually dimorphic: Males are light brown with a wavy pattern of whitish lines and a broad darker band running across the wings, forming concentric semicircles when the moth is at rest. There is a small whitish-rimmed black spot within the darker band between the centre and the leading edge of each forewing. The females are slightly larger and much darker, almost uniformly blackish brown with an indistinct lighter pattern and a forewing spot like the males have.

Adult caterpillars are greenish or brownish coloured and slightly tapered towards the head. The sides are yellowish, from the middle body segments light, dark-lined diamond spots which are black cored stand out

Similar species
Due to the very characteristic wing drawing, the female moths are unmistakable. In the males there is a distant resemblance to grey-brown specimens of  Xanthorhoe designata. In  X. designata the midfield is, though, predominantly reddish-brown and bounded by a narrow black band.

Biology
The caterpillar larvae feed on a wide range of low-growing core eudicots, but prefer asterids. Host plants recorded from the Central European part of its range include:

Euasterids I
 Gentianales: Rubiaceae
 Galium (bedstraws)
 Solanales: Convolvulaceae
 Convolvulus (true bindweeds)
Euasterids II
 Asterales: Asteraceae
 Anthemis (dog-fennels)
 Chrysanthemum (chrysanthemums)
 Eupatorium (bonesets)
 Senecio (ragworts and groundsels) – e.g. common groundsel (S. vulgaris) in the British Isles
Eurosids II
 Brassicales: Brassicaceae
 Alyssum (alyssums)
 Nasturtium (watercresses)
Basal core eudicots
 Caryophyllales: Polygonaceae
 Polygonum (knotweed)
 Rumex (docks and sorrels)

Synonyms
The widespread, strongly sexually dimorphic and somewhat phenotypically variable gem has been described anew time and again by various authors, even as late as the early 20th century, but all these supposedly distinct taxa are nowadays considered to refer to a single species. Junior synonyms of the gem include:

Footnotes

References
 (1942). "Seltsame Geometridenfunde". [Peculiar records of geometer moths]. Zeitschrift des Wiener Entomologen-Vereins. 27: 109. 
 "70.047 BF1720 The Gem Nycterosea obstipata (Fabricius, 1794)". Retrieved May 15, 2019.

External links

Nycterosea obstipata on Fauna Europaea
Lepiforum e.V.
Nycterosea obstipata on De Vlinderstichting 

Xanthorhoini
Moths of Europe
Moths of Cape Verde
Moths of Africa
Moths of Iceland
Moths of Japan
Moths described in 1794
Taxa named by Johan Christian Fabricius